Hayam Vuruk (Indonesian : Hayam Wuruk, Sanskrit: हयम् वुरुक्, Kawi: ꦲꦪꦩ꧀ꦮꦸꦫꦸꦏ꧀) (1334–1389), also called Rajasanagara, Pa-ta-na-pa-na-wu, or Bhatara Prabhu after 1350, was a Javanese Hindu emperor from the Rajasa Dynasty and the 4th emperor of the Majapahit Empire. Together with his prime minister Gajah Mada, he reigned the empire at the time of its greatest power. During his reign, the Hindu epics, the Ramayana and the Mahabharata, became ingrained in the culture and worldview of the Javanese through the wayang kulit (leather puppets). He was preceded by Tribhuwana Wijayatunggadewi, and succeeded by his son-in-law Wikramawardhana. 

Most of the accounts of his life were taken from the Nagarakretagama, a eulogy to Hayam Wuruk, and the Pararaton ("Book of Kings"), a Javanese historical chronicle.

Early life

According to the Nagarakretagama, Canto 1, Stanzas 4 and 5, Hayam Wuruk was born in 1256 Saka year, corresponding to 1334 CE, the same year that Mount Kelud erupted. Mpu Prapanca, author of the Nagarakretagama, argued that this was the divine sign that Batara Gurunata (the Javanese name for Shiva Mahadewa) had manifest himself on earth, reincarnated as the Javanese king.

Hayam Wuruk's name can be translated as "scholar rooster". He was the son of Tribhuwana Tunggadewi and Sri Kertawardhana (or Cakradhara). His mother was the daughter of Raden Wijaya, founder of Majapahit, while his father was the son of Bhre Tumapel, a lesser king of Singhasari. Both the Pararaton and the Nagarakretagama praised Hayam Wuruk as a handsome, bright, talented, and exceptional student in the courtly martial arts of archery and fencing, who also mastered politics, scriptures, arts, and music. He was known as an accomplished ceremonial dancer in the court, and some accounts tell of his performances in the traditional ceremonial Javanese mask dance. His mother, Queen Tribhuwana, educated and groomed him to become the next monarch of Majapahit.

Reign

In 1350, Gayatri Rajapatni died in her retirement at a Buddhist monastery. She was the consort of Raden Wijaya, the first king of Majapahit, and also the grandmother of Hayam Wuruk. Queen Tribhuwana had to abdicate because she ruled Majapahit under Rajapatni's auspices, and was obliged to relinquish the throne to her son.

Hayam Wuruk inherited the throne in 1350 at the age of 16 when the mahapatih (prime minister) Gajah Mada was at the height of his career. Under his rule, Majapahit extended its power throughout the Indonesian archipelago of Nusantara.
In 1365 (1287 Saka year), Mpu Prapanca wrote the kakawin of Nagarakretagama, the old Javanese eulogy for King Hayam Wuruk. The manuscript described Hayam Wuruk's royal excursion around the Majapahit realm to visit villages, holy shrines, vassal kingdoms, and territory in East Java. He sent ambassadors to China from 1370 to 1381.

Personal life 
According to the Pararaton and Kidung Sunda, in 1357, King Hayam Wuruk was expected to marry Dyah Pitaloka Citraresmi, a daughter of King Linggabuana of the united Sunda Kingdom and Galuh Kingdom. She was described as a princess with extraordinary beauty, but the reason for this royal engagement was probably political, to foster the alliance between the Majapahit and the Sundanese Kingdoms. However, in the Bubat incident, the Sunda royal family and their guards were involved in a skirmish with Majapahit troops. The planned royal wedding ended in disaster with the death of the princess and the whole Sunda royal party. Pitaloka took her own life at about 17 years old.

The court officials blamed Gajah Mada, sine it was his intention to demand submission from Sunda Kingdom that ended in bloodshed. 

Several years later, Hayam Wuruk married his relative who was more famous as Queen Shri Sudevi or Queen Sori (Kawi : Paduka Sori), her birth  name was unknown. She was a stepdaughter of Hayam Wuruk's maternal aunt. They had a daughter, Crown Princess Kusumawardhani, the Duchess of Kabalan. Hayam Wuruk arraged her to marry her cousin, Dyah Gagak Sali who was the future King Wikramawardhana. His mother was Hayam Wuruk's sister, Princess Iswari.

However, from a concubine, Hayam Wuruk had a son, the 2nd Duke of Wirabhumi (his birth name was unknown). 

After Hayam Wuruk's death in 1389, the empire fell into chaos and decline during the contest over succession between Wikramawardhana and Wirabhumi. The dispute ended in Wirabhumi's defeat in the Regreg war. Wikramawardhana succeeded Hayam Wuruk as the King of Majapahit.

Legacy

His reign, as part of Indosphere culturally, helped further Indianisation of Javanese culture through the spread of Hinduism and Sanskritization.

See also

 Gosari inscription
 Jabung
 Penataran
 Hinduism in Indonesia
 Hinduism in Java
 Agama Hindu Dharma
 Kejawèn
 Nagarakretagama
 List of Hindu temples in Indonesia
 Jalan Gajah Mada and Jalan Hayam Wuruk

References

Further reading
 

1334 births
1389 deaths
Kings of Majapahit
Javanese monarchs
Hindu monarchs
Indonesian Hindu monarchs
Majapahit
14th-century monarchs in Asia
Javanese people
14th-century Indonesian people
14th-century Hindus